Donald Buchla (April 17, 1937 – September 14, 2016) was an American pioneer in the field of sound synthesis. Buchla popularized the "West Coast" style of synthesis. He was co-inventor of the voltage controlled modular synthesizer along with Robert Moog, the two working independently in the early 1960s.

Biography
Buchla was born in South Gate, California on April 17, 1937, and grew up in California and New Jersey. He studied physics, physiology, and music at UC Berkeley, graduating in 1959 as a physics major.

Buchla formed his electronic music equipment company, Buchla and Associates, in 1962 in Berkeley, California. He was commissioned by composers Morton Subotnick and Ramon Sender, both of the San Francisco Tape Music Center, to create an electronic instrument for live performance. Buchla began designing his first modules for the Tape Music Center in 1963.

With partial funding from a $500 Rockefeller Foundation grant made to the Tape Music Center, Buchla assembled his modules into the Buchla Modular Electronic Music System (later known as the Series 100) in 1965, which he began selling commercially in 1966. Buchla's synthesizers experimented in control interfaces, such as touch-sensitive plates. In 1969 the Series 100 was briefly sold to CBS Musical Instruments, who soon after dropped the line, not seeing the synthesizer market as a profitable area.

1970 saw the release of the Buchla 200 series Electric Music Box, which was manufactured until 1985. Buchla created the Buchla Series 500, the first digitally controlled analog synthesizer, in 1971.

Shortly after, the Buchla Series 300 was released, which combined the Series 200 with microprocessors. The Music Easel, a small, portable, all-in-one synthesizer was released in 1972. The Buchla 400, with a video display, was released in 1982. In 1987, Buchla released the fully MIDI enabled Buchla 700.

Beginning in the 1990s, Buchla began designing alternative MIDI controllers, such as the Thunder, Lightning, and Marimba Lumina.  With the recent resurgence of interest in analog synthesizers Buchla has released a revamped 200 series called the 200e.

In 2005, NIME-05 (5th International Conference on New Interfaces for Musical Expression), in Vancouver, Canada, featured a keynote lecture by Don Buchla. There was also a sizable exhibition of many of the instruments he and his team have created over the years.

In 2012, Buchla's intellectual property was acquired by an Australian holding company, Audio Supermarket, which started a new brand called Buchla Electronic Musical Instruments (BEMI). Mr. Buchla was retained as Chief Technology Officer.

In 2015, it was reported that Don Buchla had taken the owners of BEMI to court, citing health problems due in part to unpaid consulting fees and asserting a claim to his original intellectual property. The lawsuit alleged breach of contract and "bad-faith conduct" on the part of BEMI's owners and sought $500,000 in compensation.

Legal documents filed with the state of California indicate that the court ordered the case to be settled by arbitration in July 2015. In August 2016, the court dismissed the case in light of the fact that the parties had reached an out-of-court settlement.

As of 2018, a new company called Buchla U.S.A. has been created to carry on Don's legacy and continue producing his 200e modular synthesizer system, with certain individuals involved in engineering and manufacturing remaining involved.

Death
Buchla died at the age of 79 on September 14, 2016 of complications from cancer in Berkeley, California.

Personal life
He was survived by his wife, a son, Ezra Buchla who is a musician,  daughters Jeannine Serbanich and Erin Buchla, and two grandchildren.

Products

References

External links

Buchla and Associates
Audities Foundation Buchla instrument collection 
"Oral History: Don Buchla explains pieces of his life story and career." January 16, 2011. NAMM Oral History Library
Instrumental Instruments: Buchla

1937 births
2016 deaths
Businesspeople from New York City
Inventors of musical instruments
Deaths from cancer in California
20th-century American businesspeople